Florian-Horst Carstens (born 8 November 1998) is a German professional footballer who plays as a centre-back for Wehen Wiesbaden, on loan from FC St. Pauli.

References

External links
 
 Profile at kicker.de

1998 births
Living people
German footballers
Association football central defenders
FC St. Pauli II players
FC St. Pauli players
SV Wehen Wiesbaden players
2. Bundesliga players
3. Liga players
Regionalliga players